Colégio Polilogos was a South Korean international school in Bom Retiro, Sao Paulo, Brazil. It was operated by Associação Brasileira de Educação Coreana (ABEC) and was the largest Korean international day school in South America. It was recognized by the South Korean government  and was bilingual in Korean and Portuguese.

Construction started around 1996. It opened in 1998. The Ministry of Education (South Korea) helped pay for the establishment of the school, which took 3.5 billion won of ministry funding and donations and another 3.5 billion won of investments. At some point it was not registered as a nonprofit organization in Brazil, so taxes began to decimate the school in a three-year period. It closed in 2017.

References

External links
  

1998 establishments in Brazil
Educational institutions established in 1998
2017 disestablishments in Brazil
Educational institutions disestablished in 2017
International schools in São Paulo
Korean international schools
Brazil–South Korea relations